Vilson James-Lukas Vattanirappel (born 4 November 1992) is an Austrian badminton player.

Achievements

BWF International Challenge/Series
Men's singles

Men's doubles

Mixed doubles

 BWF International Challenge tournament
 BWF International Series tournament
 BWF Future Series tournament

References

External links
 

1992 births
Living people
Austrian male badminton players